Cours (Languedocien: Corts) is a former commune in the Lot department in south-western France. On 1 January 2017, it was merged into the new commune Bellefont-La Rauze. Its population was 277 in 2019.

See also
Communes of the Lot department

References

Former communes of Lot (department)